Shassia Ubillus Falcón (born 1983) is a Panamanian model and a pageant titleholder from Ciudad de Panamá, Panamá who was represented the Distrito Central state in the Miss International Panamá 2008 pageant, on June, 2008, and was the 1st Runner-Up  acquired the title of Miss Panamá Earth 2008.

She won the Best National Costume.

Also won the titles Miss Fitness and Miss Slim of Miss International Panamá 2008 pageant winner by Alejandra Arias who represent Panamá in Miss International 2008. Later represent Panamá in the contest Miss Caraïbes Hibiscus in Saint Martin.

References

External links
 Bellezas Panamá  official website

1983 births
Living people
Miss Earth 2008 contestants
Señorita Panamá
Panamanian beauty pageant winners